This is a list of Latvian football transfers in the 2017–18 winter transfer window by club. Only transfers of the Virslīga are included.

All transfers mentioned are shown in the references at the bottom of the page. If you wish to insert a transfer that isn't mentioned there, please add a reference.

Latvian Higher League

Spartaks 

In:

Out:

Liepāja 

In:

 
 

Out:

Riga FC 

In:

   

Out:

Ventspils 

In:

 

   
 
 

Out:

RFS 

In:

     

Out:

Jelgava 

In:

 

    
 

        

Out:

METTA/LU 

In:

Out:

Valmiera 

In:

Out:

References

External links 
 sportacentrs.com 

2017-18
Latvia
Football
tansfers
tansfers